Suvira Jaiswal is an Indian historian. She is known for her research into the social history of ancient India, especially the evolution of the caste system and the development and absorption of regional deities into the Hindu pantheon.

Biography
Suvira Jaiswal obtained a master's degree in history from Allahabad University. She received her doctorate under at the guidance of Ram Sharan Sharma at Patna University.

Jaiswal taught at Patna University from 1962. She was a professor at the Centre for Historical Studies at Jawaharlal Nehru University from 1971 until her retirement in 1999.

In 2007, Jaiswal was the General President of the Indian History Congress.

Research
Jaiswal has researched the evolution of the caste system in India, its origins and functions. She showed that in the period of the Rig Veda, the caste system hadn't yet become the complex hierarchy of later periods. She showed that the grihapati, previously thought to be a head of a family, was in fact the leader of an extended kin-group, and that the transition from a pastoral to a sedentary mode of production led to increased social stratification with the grihapati becoming an archetype of the patriarchal principle. Jaiswal showed that neither skin colour and notions of race were the basis of caste (varna) differentiation. Rather, it was the unequal access to economic and political power that entrenched status distinctions and crystallised the hierarchy.

She also determined that there were consequences to specialist economic roles, endogamy and hierarchical society: the systematic suppression of women as a class. In particular, she pointed out that there was insufficient surplus production of goods in the Rig Vedic period to allow any section of society to withdraw from economic activity. This meant that women were more or less autonomous in their agency, having access to education and free movement.

Selected works

Articles
 
 
 
 
 
 
 'Caste in the Socio-Economic Framework of Early India', Presidential Address, Section 1, in Proceedings of the Indian History Congress, 38th Session, Bhubaneswar, 1977, pp. 23–48.
 'Semitising Hinduism: Changing Paradigms of Brahmanical Integration', Social Scientist, vol. 19, no. 12, 1991, pp. 20–32.
 'The Changing Concept of Gahapati', in D. N. Jha, ed., Society and Ideology in India: Essays in Honour of Professor R. S. Sharma, Delhi: Munshiram Manoharlal, 1996: 29–37.
 'Tribe-Caste interaction: A Re-examination of certain Issues', in Dev Nathan, ed., From Tribe to Caste, Shimla: IIAS, 1997: 167–75.

Books

References 

Living people
Indian women academics
Indian women historians
20th-century Indian historians
Academic staff of Jawaharlal Nehru University
Emeritus Professors in India
Historians of South Asia
Historians of India
21st-century Indian historians
University of Allahabad alumni
Patna University alumni
20th-century Indian women writers
20th-century Indian writers
21st-century Indian women writers
21st-century Indian writers
Year of birth missing (living people)